"Virus (How About Now)" is a song by Dutch DJs and record producers Martin Garrix and MOTi. It was released as a digital download on 13 October 2014 on Beatport and on 27 October 2014 on iTunes. The song was written by Martin Garrix, Niclas Lundin, Leon Paul Palmen, MOTi and Jenny Wahlström, who also provided vocals for the track.

Music video
A music video to accompany the release of "Virus (How About Now)" was first released onto YouTube on 13 October 2014 at a total length of three minutes and nineteen seconds.

Chart performance

Weekly charts

Year-end charts

Release history

References

2014 singles
2014 songs
Martin Garrix songs
Spinnin' Records singles
Songs written by Martin Garrix